Trent Ford (born January 15, 1979) is an American-born English actor and model.

Early life and education
Ford was born in Akron, Ohio. His father was a test pilot for the United States Navy, and his mother was a British Airways head stewardess from Birmingham, West Midlands. His parents met in Kuwait. He moved to the United Kingdom at the age of one with his parents and grew up in Cradley, West Midlands and Malvern, Worcestershire with his brother and two sisters. He studied English and economics at Clare College, Cambridge.

Career 
Ford starred in the films Deeply (with Kirsten Dunst), Gosford Park, Slap Her... She's French (released in the U.S. as She Gets What She Wants), How to Deal (with Mandy Moore), and September Dawn (opposite Jon Voight). Ford portrayed Jean-Paul, the French boyfriend of Zoey Bartlet (Elisabeth Moss) in six episodes of the fourth season of the television drama The West Wing, and Superman's future enemy, Mr. Mxyzptlk, in the fourth season episode of Smallville titled "Jinx". He appeared as Steve in one episode of the FOX/WB sitcom Grounded for Life opposite Donal Logue and Megyn Price. He also played Benjamin Chow, the boyfriend of Kat Warbler (Lizzy Caplan's character), in five episodes of the CBS sitcom The Class. In the first season of the NBC series Life, he played Jeffrey Farmer opposite Damian Lewis.

Ford was the leading man in the global advertising campaign for the Calvin Klein perfume Eternity Moment opposite Scarlett Johansson, shot by Peter Lindbergh. Ford has also appeared in advertising campaigns for Gap, Abercrombie & Fitch, and Valentino.

In 2008, Ford starred in the love story/thriller Rez Bomb about a Lakota girl and a white boy who are very much in love but get themselves into trouble with a brutal money lender.

Ford played a vampire named Trevor in three episodes of The CW supernatural drama The Vampire Diaries. In November 2011, Ford appeared in one episode of the CW drama 90210. In March 2012, Ford filmed J. J. Abrams' CW TV pilot Shelter, portraying a British rock star named Tyler Dean.

In May 2012, Ford played the lead role, Alex, in a short film titled Shoot'er, opposite Nikki Sixx, directed by P.R. Brown.

On September 29, 2013, Ford appeared in the Season 6 premiere episode of The Mentalist on CBS.

Ford starred in Burning Blue, a military drama about two Navy fighter pilots who find themselves in the midst of a forbidden relationship, throwing their lives and careers into disarray. Lionsgate released the film on June 6, 2014.

On August 6, 2014, Sixx:A.M. premiered their music video for the single "Gotta Get It Right" off their Modern Vintage album, featuring Ford.

Ford starred with Mischa Barton in Deserted, a thriller about a road trip to Death Valley that results in getting hopelessly lost in the most stunning yet unforgiving topographical terrain on the planet.

Ford starred in Superior, a short film about a stranger passing through town who sparks a teenage girl's desire to distinguish herself from her identical twin sister. The film premiered at Sundance Film Festival on January 23, 2015.

Personal life 
Ford has been in a relationship with American actress and model Natalie Cohen since March 2011.

Filmography

References

External links

Storm Models London: Trent Ford Portfolio

Trent Ford Film: Burning Blue
Trent Ford Film: Rez Bomb

1979 births
Alumni of Clare College, Cambridge
American male film actors
American male television actors
American emigrants to England
American people of English descent
English male film actors
English male models
English male television actors
Living people
Male actors from Akron, Ohio
People from Cradley, West Midlands
People from Malvern, Worcestershire